The following is a list of companies based in Oklahoma City, Oklahoma.

Major companies based in Oklahoma City
Chesapeake Energy - Fortune 500 (163)
Continental Resources (NYSE)
Devon Energy - Fortune 500 (270) and NYSE
Love's Travel Stops & Country Stores - Forbes Largest Private Companies (13)
OGE Energy - Fortune 1000 (523) and NYSE
Paycom - Fortune 100 (2)  (NYSE)
SandRidge Energy (NYSE) 
Sonic Drive-In Restaurants (NASDAQ)

Other companies based in Oklahoma City
Ackerman McQueen Advertising
American Fidelity Assurance
Braum's Ice Cream Store & Restaurants
CMI Roadbuilding, Inc.
Crowe & Dunlevy
Digital Designs
Feed the Children
Globe Insurance Company
Griffin Communications
Hobby Lobby
MidFirst Bank
Orange Leaf
Oscium
Skulls Unlimited International, Inc.
Taco Mayo Restaurants
Tinker Federal Credit Union
Tyler Media Group

Others with a significant presence
AAR Defense Systems & Logistics (Regional Headquarters)
AT&T - Fortune 500 (Regional Headquarters)
Baker Hughes, Inc.
Bank of America
Ben E. Keith Company
The Boeing Company
Chase
The Coca-Cola Company
COX Enterprises - Fortune 500 (Regional Headquarters)
Dell
Ernst & Young
Farmers Insurance
General Electric
Goodyear
Grant Thornton
The Hartford
Hertz
Hewlett-Packard
Hitachi, Ltd.
Johnson Controls
KPMG
Nestlé Purina PetCare
Northrop Grumman
Office Max
Pratt & Whitney
PricewaterhouseCoopers
Remy International
Seagate Technology
Southwest Airlines
State Farm Insurance
U.S. Cellular
UPS
Verizon Wireless
Williams-Sonoma, Inc.
Xerox

Defunct
Anderson-Prichard Oil Corporation
Dobson Cellular
Home State Life Insurance Company
Kerr-McGee
Layton & Forsyth
Penn Square Bank
Ridley Motorcycle Company
Rocketplane Limited, Inc.

References

Oklahoma City
Oklahoma City